Tarisa Watanagase (RTGS: Tharisa Watthanaket; ; born 30 November 1949) is a former governor of the Bank of Thailand (2006–2010). She succeeded Pridiyathorn Devakula, who was appointed finance minister in the interim government. Tarisa was an assistant governor of the BoT and is the first female governor in the bank's 64-year history.

Education and career
An economist, Tarisa joined the central bank in 1975. She was appointed deputy governor in 1992. She graduated from 
Triam Udom Suksa School. She received a bachelor of economics and master of economics from Keio University, Tokyo, Japan and a doctor of economics from Washington University in St. Louis, United States. She attended the six-week Advanced Management Program at Harvard University. She served as an economist at the International Monetary Fund from 1988 to 1990. She speaks Thai, English, Japanese.

References

1949 births
Living people
Tarisa Watanagase
Tarisa Watanagase
Washington University in St. Louis alumni
Keio University alumni
Place of birth missing (living people)
Tarisa Watanagase
Women bankers
Tarisa Watanagase
Tarisa Watanagase
Tarisa Watanagase